The Palace of marqués de Miraflores (Spanish: Palacio del marqués de Miraflores) is a palace located in Madrid, Spain. It was declared Bien de Interés Cultural in 1976.

References 

Palaces in Madrid
Bien de Interés Cultural landmarks in Madrid
Buildings and structures in Cortes neighborhood, Madrid